Indian television drama (in Indian English Indian serials) are television programs written, produced, and filmed in India, with characters played by Indian actors and episodes broadcast on Indian television.

India's first television drama was titled Hum Log (Hindi), which aired in 1984–85, and concluded with 154 episodes. Kyunki Saas Bhi Kabhi Bahu Thi (Hindi) (2000–2008) was the first Indian TV drama to cross 1,000 episodes and concluded with 1,833 episodes. Char Divas Sasuche (Marathi) (2001–2013) was the first Indian serial to cross 2,000 and 3,000 episodes, also entering in Limca Book of Records, which concluded with 3,200 episodes. The Bengali crime show Police File crossed 5,000 episodes. The Telugu serial Abhishekam (2008–2022) was the first Indian serial with 4,000 episodes and concluded on 1 February 2022. Yeh Rishta Kya Kehlata Hai (2009–present) is the longest running Hindi TV show of India, and the longest-running soap opera, airing for 14 years as of 2023. 

Indian serials are made in almost all of the major languages in India, though many also contain a mix of the predominant language and English. Indian dramas are also broadcast in other parts of South Asia, the Caribbean, Southeast Asia, Central Asia, Western Europe, Southeastern Europe, the Middle East, North America, Latin America, North Africa, Southeast Africa, and francophone Africa.

History

India's first television drama was Hum Log, which first aired in 1984–85 and concluded with 154 episodes, was the longest running serial in the history of Indian television at the time when it ended. It had an audience of 60 million. Each episode was about 25 minutes long, and the series finale episode was about 55 minutes. At the end of each episode, veteran Hindi film actor Ashok Kumar would discuss the ongoing story and situations with the audience using Hindi couplets and limericks. In later episodes, he would introduce the actors who played characters in the serial and end his monologue with the Indian language versions of the words "Hum Log."

Biographies of famous people started being produced in the form of dramas like Chanakya, Dharti Ka Veer Yodha Prithviraj Chauhan, Veer Shivaji, Jhansi Ki Rani, Chittod Ki Rani Padmini Ka Johur, Bharat Ka Veer Putra – Maharana Pratap, Chakravartin Ashoka Samrat, Rudramadevi in the 1980s.
 
Crime dramas also started being produced and aired. C.I.D., follows a team of detectives belonging to the Crime Investigation Department in Mumbai. C.I.D. is the longest-running crime TV series in India, having a run of 20 years (1998–2018). Adaalat was an Indian television courtroom drama series which revolves around Advocate K.D. Pathak, is a defense lawyer with an impeccable track record of winning cases and setting helpless innocent victims free, but not at the cost of upholding the truth.

The Indian mythological drama show, Devon Ke Dev...Mahadev, recorded the highest, 8.2 TVR in an episode. 

Daytime dramas were popular during the 1990s and 2000s, with shows like Kyunki Saas Bhi Kabhi Bahu Thi,Kahaani Ghar Ghar Ki, Kasautii Zindagi Kay, Saathii Re,Doli Saja Ke,Kumkum – Ek Pyara Sa Bandhan, Kaahin Kissii Roz, Kahiin to Hoga, Roja Kootam, Woh Rehne Waali Mehlon Ki, Hamari Devrani, Kkusum,Uravugal and Metti Oli. Porus, a historical drama, based on the Indian king Porus, premiered on Sony Entertainment Television on 27 November 2017 and ended on 13 November 2018. It is currently the most expensive show in Indian history, with a budget of over Rs. 500 crores.

During the 2010s, the popularity of daytime dramas gradually declined. At present, there are no daytime dramas on any mainstream channel. Currently, the four major networks that air primetime television dramas with nationwide following are Colors TV, Star Plus, Sony Entertainment Television and Zee TV.

Social impact 

TV dramas affect Indian society, with regard to national integration, identity, Globalization, Women, ethics and social issues in rural areas. The first Indian television drama series, Hum Log, began as a family planning program, and although it quickly turned its focus to entertainment, it continued to embed pro-development messages which provided a model of utilizing the television serial as an "edutainment"  method that was followed by countries around the world.

A 2007 study of cable coming to rural India showed that it led to "significant decreases in the reported acceptability of domestic violence towards women and son preference, as well as increases in women's autonomy and decreases in fertility." It also "found suggestive evidence that exposure to cable increases school enrollment for younger children, perhaps through increased participation of women in household decision-making."

International reception

Pakistan 
Indian dramas were popular in Pakistan and Indian entertainment channels are widely watched, due to the mutual intelligibility between Urdu and Hindi. The Supreme Court of Pakistan has banned the showing of Indian films and TV shows.  The British Broadcasting Corporation has reported that cable television operators in Pakistan often violate the ban and air Indian television serials due to the high popularity and demand for these in Pakistan, and Indian television shows make up nearly 60 percent of all foreign programmes broadcast in Pakistan.

In June 2006, Pakistani comedian Rauf Lala participated and won the comedy television show, The Great Indian Laughter Challenge, but the show could not be followed by fellow Pakistanis as the show was not allowed to be aired there.  An official has commented that "Bollywood and Indian TV drama have invaded our homes".

The viewing of Indian TV dramas has become so popular that mainstream newspapers such as the Pakistan Tribune often have feature articles on the shows. Since satellite connections offer uninterrupted coverage of Indian shows, many people have bought these to watch the programmes.

Anti-Indian sentiment is reported in Pakistan and the two countries have fought 4 wars over a span of about 50 years. However, the effect of Indian TV shows and Bollywood have resulted in an increase in how "favourably an ordinary Pakistani views [India and] Indians." Certain Indian tourists to Pakistan have said that people are particularly friendly if one is from India.

On 27 October 2018, The Supreme Court of Pakistan has reintroduced the ban on Indian content on local channels in the country. The channels like Filmazia, Urdu1 had shut down Indian content for an appropriate period of time.

Afghanistan
Indian soaps became highly popular in Afghanistan during the 2000s against the backdrop of the existing high popularity of Bollywood cinema. In 2006, a Reuters press article wrote of the airing of the series Kyunki Saas Bhi Kabhi Bahu Thi, dubbed into native Dari:

According to a source, armed militants during the war in Afghanistan may have even stopped fighting to watch Indian dramas.

The strong popularity of Indian dramas was challenged by conservative hardliners who saw it as a threat to the country's religious and national values. Under pressure from conservatives, the government of Hamid Karzai ordered broadcasters to stop airing dramas in April 2008. However, broadcasters refused to comply, stating that it is against the country's media law.

The first homemade Afghan television drama serial was called Palwasha, produced by Aina Afghan Media and started airing on 25 November 2007. Although shot in Kabul and in Dari, the serial was directed by an Indian and other engineers and workers of the series were from India. Additionally, the main character was played by an Indian actress, Sonal Udeshi.

See also
 Tamil television drama
 List of longest-running Indian television series

References

Indian television soap operas
Asian drama